Arne Jutner (6 October 1920 – 8 November 2009) was a Swedish water polo player. He competed at the 1948 Summer Olympics and the 1952 Summer Olympics.

References

1920 births
2009 deaths
Swedish male water polo players
Olympic water polo players of Sweden
Water polo players at the 1948 Summer Olympics
Water polo players at the 1952 Summer Olympics
Sportspeople from Stockholm